Conor Geekie (born May 5, 2004) is a Canadian junior ice hockey centre for the Winnipeg Ice of the Western Hockey League (WHL) and a prospect of the Arizona Coyotes of the National Hockey League (NHL). He was drafted in the first round, 11th overall, by the Coyotes in the 2022 NHL Entry Draft. On July 18, 2022, he was signed to a three-year, entry-level contract with the Coyotes. He is the younger brother of Morgan Geekie of the Seattle Kraken.

Career statistics

References

External links 

2004 births
Living people
Arizona Coyotes draft picks
Ice hockey people from Manitoba
National Hockey League first-round draft picks
Virden Oil Capitals players
Winnipeg Ice players